Miss World is the oldest existing international beauty pageant. It was created in the United Kingdom by Eric Morley in 1951. Since his death in 2000, Morley's widow, Julia Morley, has co-chaired the pageant. Along with Miss Universe, Miss International, and Miss Earth, it is one of the Big Four international beauty pageants.

The current Miss World is Karolina Bielawska of Poland, who was crowned by Toni-Ann Singh of Jamaica on March 16, 2022, in San Juan, Puerto Rico.

History

20th century
In 1951, Eric Morley organised a bikini contest as part of the Festival of Britain celebrations that he called the Festival Bikini Contest. The event was popular with the press, which dubbed it "Miss World". The swimsuit competition was intended as a promotion for the bikini, which had only recently been introduced to the market and was still widely regarded as immodest. When the 1951 Miss World pageant winner, Kerstin "Kiki" Hakansson from Sweden, was crowned in a bikini, it added to the controversy.

The pageant was originally planned as a Pageant for the Festival of Britain, but Morley decided to make the Miss World pageant annual. He registered the "Miss World" name as a trademark, and all future pageants were held under that name. But because of the controversy arising from Håkansson's crowning in a bikini, countries with religious traditions threatened not to send delegates to future events, and the bikini was condemned by the Pope. Objection to the bikini led to its replacement in all future pageants with more modest swimwear, and from 1976 swimsuits were replaced by evening gowns for the crowning. Håkansson remains the only Miss World crowned in a bikini. In Miss World 2013 all participants wore a one-piece swimsuit plus a traditional sarong below the waist as a compromise with local culture.

Morley announced the Miss World winners in the order No. 3, No. 2 and No. 1. This was intended to keep the tension up, and avoid the anticlimax if Nos. 2 and 3 are announced after the winner.

In 1959, the BBC began to broadcast the pageant. Its popularity grew with the advent of television. During the 1960s and 1970s, Miss World was among the most watched programs of the year on British television. In 1970, the contest in London was disrupted by women's liberation protesters armed with flour bombs, stink bombs, and water pistols loaded with ink. The 1970 contest was also controversial when South Africa sent two contestants (one black and one white). Henceforth, South Africa was banned from the contest until apartheid was abolished. More than 18 million people watched the pageant at its peak during the late 1970s and early 1980s.

In the 1980s, the pageant repositioned itself with the slogan "Beauty With a Purpose", with added tests of intelligence and personality. In 1984, BBC1 controller Michael Grade announced that the corporation would cease to broadcast beauty pageants the next January, after it had shown Miss Great Britain, saying, "I believe these contests no longer merit national air time." He added, "They are an anachronism in this day and age of equality and verging on the offensive.'' Thames Television broadcast Miss World between 1980 and 1988, when ITV dropped it.

During the early 1990s, mainstream television broadcasts of the event declined in popularity after it became "increasingly unfashionable" in the late 1980s. The pageant returned on satellite channel Sky One in 1997, before moving to Channel 5 for three years (1998–2000).

Eric Morley died in 2000, and his wife, Julia, succeeded him as chair of the Miss World organisation.

21st century
The first black African Miss World winner, Agbani Darego of Nigeria, was crowned in 2001. As part of its marketing strategy, Miss World came up with a "Vote For Me" television special during that edition, featuring the delegates behind the scenes and on the beach, and allowing viewers to phone in or vote online for their favourites. It also sells broadcasters its Talent, Beach Beauty and Sports events as television specials. ITV broadcast the 2001 pageant from South Africa on digital channel ITV2, with the special airing a week earlier on the main ITV channel.

In 2002, the pageant was slated to host its final in Abuja, Nigeria. This choice was controversial, as a northern Nigerian woman, Amina Lawal, was awaiting death by stoning for adultery under Sharia law there, but Miss World used the publicity surrounding its presence to bring greater global awareness and action to Lawal's plight. No British channel agreed to broadcast the event, and there were objections to the contest.

Former Miss World Aishwarya Rai attended the Miss World 2014 ceremony with her husband Abhishek Bachchan, daughter Aaradhya and mother Brinda Rai. The pageant has been broadcast on local TV channel London Live since 2014.

Miss World Organization

The Miss World Organization owns and manages the annual Miss World Finals, a competition that has grown into one of the world's biggest. Since its launch in 1951, the Miss World organisation has raised more than £1 billion for children's charities that help disabled and underprivileged children. Miss World is franchised in more than 100 countries.

1970s–1990s
The Miss World pageant has been the target of many controversies since its inception.
 In 1970, feminist protesters threw flour bombs during the live event at London's Royal Albert Hall, momentarily alarming the host, Bob Hope.
 The 1973 winner, Marjorie Wallace, was stripped of her title on 8 March 1974 because she had failed to fulfill the basic requirements of the job. Miss World's organizers did not elect someone to serve in her place.
 In 1976, several countries boycotted the pageant because it included both a Caucasian and an African contestant from South Africa. South Africa competed for the last time in 1977, before returning in 1991 as apartheid disintegrated.
 The 1980 winner, Gabriella Brum of Germany, resigned one day after winning, initially claiming her boyfriend disapproved. A few days later it emerged that she had been forced to resign after it was discovered that she had posed naked for a magazine.

Nigeria 2002

In the year leading up the finals in Nigeria, several European title holders lobbied their governments and the EU parliament to support Amina Lawal's cause. A number of contestants followed the lead of Kathrine Sørland of Norway in boycotting the contest (despite the controversy, Sørland became a semifinalist in both the Miss World and Miss Universe contests), while others, such as Costa Rica, were instructed by their national governments and parliaments not to attend. Among the other boycotting nations were Denmark, Spain, Switzerland, Panama, Belgium and Kenya. There was further controversy over the possibly suspended participation of France and South Africa, which might or might not have been due to the boycott. Lawal asked that contestants not suspend their participation in the contest, saying that it was for the good of her country and that they could, as the representative of Sweden had earlier remarked, make a much stronger case for her on the ground in Nigeria.

Despite the increasing international profile the boycott was garnering in the world press, the contest proceeded in Nigeria after being rescheduled to avoid taking place during Ramadan, with many prominent nations sending delegates. Osmel Sousa of Venezuela, one of the world's most influential national directors, said, "there is no question about it [the participation of Miss Venezuela in the contest]." But the trouble did not end there. A ThisDay (Lagos, Nigeria) newspaper editorial suggesting that Muhammad would probably have chosen one of his wives from among the contestants had he been alive to see it resulted in inter-religious riots that started on 22 November in which over 200 people were killed in the city of Kaduna and many houses of worship were burned by religious zealots. Because of these riots, the 2002 pageant was moved to London, following widely circulated reports that Canada's and Korea's representatives had withdrawn from the contest and returned to their respective countries out of safety concerns. A fatwa urging the beheading of the woman who wrote the offending words, Isioma Daniel, was issued in Nigeria, but was declared null and void by the relevant Saudi Arabian authorities. Upon the pageant's return to Britain, many of the boycotting contestants chose to attend, including Miss Norway, Kathrine Sørland, who was ironically tipped in the last few days as the favourite for the crown she had previously boycotted.

The eventual winner of the pageant was Azra Akın of Turkey, the first predominantly Muslim country to hold the title since Egypt in 1954.

Indonesia 2013

In Miss World 2013, protests by Islamic groups began a few weeks before the contest began, resulting in the pageant's finale and all pre-pageant activities being isolated to Hindu-majority Bali.

China 2015

Anastasia Lin, Miss World Canada, was not given a visa to travel in China and hence missed the official deadline of 20 November 2015 for entry to the 2015 pageant, and was declared persona non grata by the Chinese Embassy in Ottawa for openly criticizing China's human rights violations. The Miss World Organization later allowed her to compete at Miss World 2016.

Thailand 2020 and cancellation

After the 2019 pageant, the organization chose Thailand as the host country of Miss World 2020, to be held in Phuket. But due to the spread of COVID-19, most national organizations and the Miss World organization agreed to cancel the 2020 pageant to assure the delegates' safety.

Puerto Rico 2021 and impact of the COVID-19 pandemic

The edition was originally scheduled for the end of 2020 but postponed indefinitely due to the global COVID-19 pandemic. On March 8, 2021, the date was set for December 16, 2021. The threat of the Omicron variant had already been detected in some parts of the world during the pre-pageant activities, as the disease started swept across the island. On December 14, Miss World Indonesia Carla Yules tested positive for COVID-19. As a precaution, her roommate Miss World India Manasa Varanasi and five others were classified as suspected cases. Miss World Organization chair Julia Morley confirmed that the delegates were isolated and quarantined and would not be onstage for the final show if they did not produce a negative PCR test. On December 15, the Puerto Rico Department of Health confirmed 17 positive cases for COVID-19 related to the Miss World pageant activities, including contestants and technical personnel. On December 16, it was announced that Miss World Malaysia Lavanya Sivaji had tested positive for COVID-19. She was required to be isolated for 10 days and not permitted onstage during the finals. The finale, originally slated for December 16, was postponed. During a December 16 Puerto Rico Department of Health press conference, epidemiologist Melissa Marzán confirmed 15 staff and 23 contestant positive cases associated with Miss World. She added that pageant organizers, not the island's authorities, decided to postpone. The rescheduled 70th Miss World pageant took place on March 16, 2022, at Puerto Rico's José Miguel Agrelot Coliseum.

Recent titleholders

Winners gallery
† = deceased

Fast-track events
The winners of the "fast-track" competitions automatically make it to the quarter- or semifinals. The fast-track categories are Miss World Beach Beauty, Beauty With a Purpose, Sports Challenge, Talent and Top Model. Miss World Beach Beauty, replacing Miss World Best in Swimsuit, and Miss World Sports were added in 2003. Miss World Top Model was added in 2004. Miss World Multimedia was added in 2012.

Miss World Beauty With a Purpose
The Beauty with a Purpose is an event established in 1972 that is celebrated before the Miss World pageant. It awards the contestant with the most relevant and important charity project in her nation. Since 2005 the winner automatically makes the quarterfinals. Miss World 2017 Manushi Chhillar is the first and only Beauty With a Purpose recipient to win Miss World.

Miss World Talent
Miss World Talent is a talent or fast-track competition in which contestants show their abilities in singing, dancing, poetry, etc. Introduced in Miss World 1978, the winner of the event automatically makes it into the semifinals starting 2003. The award returned at Miss World 2001.

Miss World Top Model
The Miss World Top Model is a modeling fast-track competition. It was first held in 2004, but not in 2005–2006. It has been held since 2007; the winner of the competition automatically qualifies for the semifinals.

Miss World Sports Challenge 
Miss World Sports or Sportswoman is a title and award given to the winner of a sports event at Miss World. It is a fast-track or preliminary event, giving the winner automatic entry into the semifinals. In 2005, there was no Miss Sports winner because it was held as a continental team competition. Starting in 2006, the individual competition returned.

Multimedia Award (Social Media Award) 
Miss World Multimedia or Social Media Award is a title and award given to the winner of a Multimedia Challenge. It is a fast-track or preliminary event, giving the winner automatic entry into the semifinals. The score is based on the contestant's likes on Mobstar and Facebook.

Miss World Beach Beauty (Discontinued Event)
Miss World Beach Beauty was a swimsuit or fast-track competition. The Beach Beauty event started in 2003, when the Miss World Organization first held fast-track events to automatically give a semifinal spot to some of the delegates. This event allowed the Miss World delegates (over 100) to have a chance to be in the semifinals. The winner made the semifinals automatically. The Beach Beauty event showcased different swimsuits designed by Miss World 1975, Wilnelia Merced. In 2015, the organisation eliminated the swimsuit competition from the pageant.

Miss World hosts and artists

The following is a list Miss World hosts and invited artists through the years.

See also

 Beauty with a Purpose – a registered charity and nonprofit organisation associated with Miss World that raises money and participates in humanitarian projects across the world
 Big Four international beauty pageants
 Global Beauties Grand Slam Beauty Pageants

Notes

References

Further reading

External links

 

 
International beauty pageants
Recurring events established in 1951
1951 establishments in England